Henry Hintermeister (1897-1970) was a painter and illustrator who painted in the Golden Age of Illustration under the signature Hy Hintermeister. He painted as team with his father, John Henry Hintermeister, and together they created more than 1000 works. Henry may have begun began his professional career as early as 1914 (age 17), when a copyright for a Henry Hintermeister was registered. He is best known today for his "American themed paintings."

Henry’s earliest published works featured family, images of women and children, dogs, horses and recreation. He also painted fantastic scenes, with Indian maidens and scantily clad Romans and Egyptians. In later years he created ionic and semi-comical works, with subjects including the multiple dangers of crossing the street, children and grandparents, fishermen, policemen, boy scouts and hunters. One of his iconic works was the "Uncle Natchel" series of paintings for Chilean Natural Soda, which debuted in 1935 as a calendar print and ran into the early 1960s.

While Henry surpassed his father in 21st century databases, by being the main person associated with the signature "Hy Hintermeister," he got his start teaming with his father. Collectors have found it difficult on some works to tell the creator from the signature alone. When Henry began having works published in his name in 1919, his father had been working for about 30 years.  When his father died in 1945, Henry continued to paint for about 25 years more. Between them, their shared "Hy Hintermeister" had mature painters signing it for decades.

Name
Henry appeared on documents for most of his life without a middle initial. However, his birth certificate named him Henry August Adam Hintermeister, and on the 1910 census he was Henry A. A. Hintermeister. He was Henry A. Hintermeister in the New York census in 1905 and 1915.

After his father's death, he began to have some works copyrighted as Henry J. Hintermeister.

Gallery

References

20th-century American painters
American illustrators
1897 births
1970 deaths